Philippe Jean is a name. People with that name include:

 Philippe Jean (also spelled Philip Jean), a painter
 Philippe Jean (footballer), a footballer

Jean, Philippe